Gregorville is an unincorporated community in the town of Lincoln, Kewaunee County, Wisconsin, United States. The community was most likely named for Frank Gregor, a Bohemian-born farmer who was Wisconsin's next-to-last surviving Civil War veteran when he died in 1937. The post office was established in 1899, with Wenzel Zlab as the first postmaster.

Gallery

References

Unincorporated communities in Kewaunee County, Wisconsin
Unincorporated communities in Wisconsin